Leon Burchill is an Australian actor. He played Charlie in Stone Bros., Frankie in Redfern Now and Benny in Wyrmwood.

References

External links
Leon Burchill interviewed by Jackie Huggins and Peter Read in 1999 for the Seven years on - continuing life histories of Aboriginal leaders oral history project

Living people
Australian male film actors
Indigenous Australian male actors
Year of birth missing (living people)